Swedish Division 1 can refer to:

 Division 1 (Swedish football), third level in the Swedish football league system
 Swedish Women's Football Division 1, third level in the league system of Swedish women's football
 Hockeyettan, formerly known as Division 1, third tier of ice hockey in Sweden